Sampson Igwe is a Nigerian Christian clergyman and the president of the Apostolic Church Nigeria. He was inducted as the national president of the Apostolic Church Nigeria at an induction ceremony on 30 July 2017 at The Apostolic Church Nigeria, National Temple, Ororunda, Ketu, Lagos.

References

Nigerian Christian clergy
Living people
Year of birth missing (living people)